Hot Country Songs is a chart that ranks the top-performing country music songs in the United States, published by Billboard magazine.  In 1998, 26 different songs topped the chart, then published under the title Hot Country Singles & Tracks, in 52 issues of the magazine.  Chart rankings were based on weekly airplay data from country music radio stations compiled by Nielsen Broadcast Data Systems.

At the start of the year Garth Brooks was at number one with "Longneck Bottle", which had been in the top spot since the chart dated December 20, 1997.  The song remained there for the first chart of 1998 before being replaced by "A Broken Wing" by Martina McBride.  Brooks went on to have two further number ones in 1998, "Two Piña Coladas" and a cover version of Bob Dylan's "To Make You Feel My Love".  Unrelated singer Kix Brooks and his musical partner Ronnie Dunn, collectively known as Brooks & Dunn, also had three number ones in 1998.  The duo topped the listing with "How Long Gone", "Husbands and Wives" and "If You See Him/If You See Her", a collaboration with vocalist Reba McEntire.  Other acts to reach number one with more than one song in 1998 were Clint Black, Faith Hill, Hill's husband Tim McGraw, Jo Dee Messina, George Strait, Shania Twain and Dixie Chicks, whose two chart-toppers came from Wide Open Spaces, their first album to feature new vocalist Natalie Maines.

Tim McGraw spent the most weeks at number one of any act, with ten.  His song "Just to See You Smile" spent six weeks at the top, the most by one song, and was ranked number one on Billboard's year-end chart of the most popular country songs.  The final number one of the year was "You're Easy on the Eyes" by Terri Clark, who was one of four acts, all of them female, to achieve their first number one in 1998; during the late 1990s, female performers achieved a level of success on the country charts greater than they had in the first half of the decade or would in the subsequent decade.  The other first-time chart-toppers were Jo Dee Messina, who reached the top spot for the first time with "Bye, Bye"; Anita Cochran, who spent one week at the top with "What If I Said", a duet with Steve Wariner; and the all-female group Dixie Chicks, who first reached number one in August with "There's Your Trouble".

Chart history

See also
1998 in music
List of artists who reached number one on the U.S. country chart

References

1998
1998 record charts
Country